Helice may refer to:

Clay pigeon shooting
Helice (mythology)
Helike, an ancient Greek city
Helice (genus), crab genus

See also
Helices, the plural of helix